The film Old Shatterhand (known as Apaches' Last Battle in the UK) is a successful Eurowestern based on the character Old Shatterhand, written by German novelist Karl May and part of the Winnetou series. It is a West German CCC Film production co-produced with French, Italian, and Yugoslav companies and filmed in 70mm. Composer Riz Ortolani used a chorus for his film score.

It was shot at the Spandau Studios in Berlin and on locationin Croatia including at the Plitvice Lakes National Park. The film's sets were designed by the art director Otto Pischinger.

Plot summary 
Killings of innocent ranchers indicate the Apaches have broken the peace treaty. Old Shatterhand, blood brother of the Apache chief Winnetou, finds out that ruthless land grabbers did the killings, hoping to start off a war between the Indians and the settlers, and follows the trail right back to the gates of the cavalry's fort.

Background 
After the success of director Harald Reinl's Treasure of Silver Lake (Der Schatz im Silbersee) in 1962 produced by Horst Wendlandt for Rialto Film, his rival Artur Brauner from CCC Film also wanted to have his share in this upcoming series. Since Wendlandt got the rights for the original Karl May novels (although none of his films ever got too close to their respective plots), Brauner only had the chance of making a movie "inspired by" Karl May, using some of the already known characters portrayed by American Lex Barker as "Old Shatterhand" and Frenchman Pierre Brice as "Winnetou".

American Guy Madison, who had starred in the television series The Adventures of Wild Bill Hickok, played one of the bad guys and Israeli actress Daliah Lavi was one of the "damsels in distress" before turning to a singing career, as did American Bill Ramsey, the comic part in this movie, already known in Germany for his Schlager music and later jazz songs.

One mystery remained from the movie: today no one remembers who the original singer was of the song "Nothing To Say" (Die Stunde kam) by saloon singer Rosemarie, played by actress Kitty Mattern.

Box office 
In West Germany, it was the second top-grossing film of 1964, selling  tickets. In France, it was the 52nd top-grossing film of 1965, selling 1,013,075 tickets. In the Soviet Union, the film sold  tickets. This adds up to a total of  tickets sold worldwide.

Awards 
 Goldene Leinwand (Golden Screen) for over 3 million viewers within 12 months, presented on October 8, 1965 at Gloria-Palast cinema, Berlin.

See also 
 Karl May film adaptations

References

Sources

External links 
 The movie's filmmusic on records
 

1964 films
1964 Western (genre) films
1960s buddy films
Constantin Film films
Films directed by Hugo Fregonese
Films scored by Riz Ortolani
Films set in New Mexico
Films set in the 19th century
Films shot at Spandau Studios
Films shot in Croatia
Films shot in Montenegro
Films shot in Yugoslavia
German Western (genre) films
1960s German-language films
Italian Western (genre) films
Spaghetti Western films
West German films
Winnetou films
Yugoslav Western (genre) films
1960s Italian films
1960s German films
Foreign films set in the United States